Massimiliano "Max" Papis (born 3 October 1969) is an Italian professional motorsport driver who has competed in several top-level motorsports events such as Le Mans 24 Hours, Formula One and Champ Car. He has three Champ Car victories. He is the son-in-law of Emerson Fittipaldi. Papis also currently drives in the NASCAR Whelen Euro Series.

Personal life
Papis was born on 3 October 1969 in Como, Italy. He was raised in Italy and got an interest in car racing at a young age, winning several go-kart races and several rounds for racing clubs in Italy.

He is married to Tatiana Papis, daughter of the racing driver Emerson Fittipaldi, and has two children, cousins of Pietro Fittipaldi and Enzo Fittipaldi. His sons' godfathers are fellow Italian Alex Zanardi (Marco) and British Dario Franchitti (Matteo).

Papis is a member of the "brat pack", a group of CART drivers that were close friends off the track, that included Dario Franchitti, Tony Kanaan and the late Greg Moore.

Career

Formula One

Despite being a race-winner in Formula 3000, he often struggled with the unfamiliar car, and was occasionally outpaced by his much-maligned teammate, Taki Inoue. He also proved to be an unlucky driver, suffering a spectacular puncture and suspension failure on his début race at Silverstone due to clipping the pit lane wall after a tire change, being left on the grid at Hockenheim due to a transmission failure, and spinning on dust and oil kicked up by David Coulthard at the Ascari Chicane on the first lap of the Italian GP, causing a pile-up and a restart. However, he only missed out on a point in the restarted race when he was overtaken by Jean-Christophe Boullion's Sauber on the last lap. When Morbidelli returned, Papis was out of a drive and headed to America for 1996.

Champ Car
He moved to CART Champ Car racing in 1996 as a replacement for Jeff Krosnoff, who was killed in the previous race in Toronto. In 1999, he joined the more competitive Rahal team, almost winning the US 500 before running out of fuel, and finishing fifth in the series. He started the next year by winning the 2000 season-opener, but failed to finish in the championship Top 10. In 2001, he won twice and finished sixth overall, but was dropped by the team, mainly due to two collisions with teammate Kenny Bräck. In 2002, he competed with Sigma Autosport, scoring two third places finishes at Long Beach and Milwaukee, before the team folded due to financial problems. The Italian did a partial season with PK Racing in 2003, with a best result of fourth at Road America. Papis also raced in the 2002 and 2006 Indianapolis 500s for Cheever Racing, claiming a 14th-place finish in his second appearance. He mostly concentrated on sportscars since 2001, remarking that "Champ Car needs me more than I need it" as the series struggled to fill its grid for 2003 after many teams defected to the IRL.

IndyCar
Papis raced in the IRL early in his career. He has raced for Roger Penske, Andretti-Green Racing and Panther Racing from 2001 to 2009. Papis is a long-time friend of drivers Tony Kanaan and Alex Zanardi. In 2013 at the Indianapolis 500, Papis and Zanardi were present in the victory celebration when Kanaan won his first Indy 500.

In 2016, Papis was hired by the IndyCar Series as a race steward along with Arie Luyendyk and Dan Davis.

ASCAR
On 8 June 2003, Papis made his debut in the ASCAR Racing Series by joining Team HTML in the British Stock Car racing series. He made his debut in Round 3 of the championship driving the No.68 Pontiac, placing 14th overall at Rockingham Motor Speedway. This would be his only race during the season and he was replaced by Derek Hayes for the rest of the season.

NASCAR

He made his NASCAR debut in August 2006, competing in the Busch Series race at Watkins Glen International Raceway for McGill Motorsports following the release of Tim Sauter from the ride. He attempted to qualify for the NASCAR Cup Series race but failed to qualify.

Papis also announced that he would run 2 races in 2007 for James Finch's Phoenix Racing No. 01 Chevy. In his first race, at Montreal in the inaugural NAPA 200, Papis avoided Marcos Ambrose' crash (caused by a disqualified Robby Gordon), with 2 laps left, to finish in third place. At Watkins Glen the next week, his engine failed on lap 2.

Papis made his Cup Series debut at Infineon Raceway in 2008, piloting the No. 66 Haas CNC Racing Chevrolet in place of regular driver Scott Riggs. He was also scheduled to drive the No. 64 car for Rusty Wallace, Inc. on three road course races in the 2008 Nationwide Series. Haas CNC Racing hired Papis to drive the No. 70 Chevrolet Monte Carlo at the course at Watkins Glen in the Sprint Cup Series in August 2008. He was announced as the driver of the No. 13 GEICO Toyota in 18 races in the 2009 and a full-time ride in the 2010 Sprint Cup.

In his first Cup season with a dedicated ride, Papis recorded a career best 8th-place finish at Watkins Glen and 15th starting position at Fontana. He also recorded 12th-place finish at Infineon Raceway. In February at Daytona in 2010, Papis had the fastest truck in the truck series event, nearly winning his first Truck series event after leading for some laps. Papis was collected in an accident with 15 laps left in the race, while going towards the lead.

After Watkins Glen in 2010 the team announced that Papis would be replaced by Casey Mears for 2011 and Papis would race in the Truck Series for the team.

Also in 2010, Papis recorded a top-30 finish in the Daytona 500, but failed to qualify at Bristol. He nearly had a top ten running at Talladega but was caught up in an accident. At Montreal in the Nationwide Series, Papis drove for Richard Childress Racing and while leading on the final lap, took too much of a last-turn curb, got passed by Boris Said, and recorded a second-place finish.

In 2011, Papis raced in the Truck Series partly for Germain, resulting in an 18th-place finish in the standings.

From 2011 to 2013, Papis had good runs on the road-course races but did not win any of them. In 2011 at Road America he had a good car, but he was spun out by Jacques Villeneuve with two laps left. When the race ended, Papis blocked Villeneuve's car on pit road and they argued. In 2012, Papis finished in fourth-place at Road America. Also in 2012, Papis ran one race in NASCAR Canadian Tire Series at Kawartha Speedway driving No. 24 Dodge for Scott Steckly, he started 16th and finished 21st.

In 2013 at Road America, Papis, who spent nearly the entire race in the top five, found himself being spun out twice in the waning laps. When the race was over, a furious Papis went up to Billy Johnson (who spun him out one of the times) and slapped him. After being separated by officials Papis and Johnson exchanged shouts ending with Papis walking off. When he spoke to reporters, Papis apologized for the slap.

In early August 2013, Papis was named to substitute for Tony Stewart in the No. 14 Chevrolet in the Sprint Cup Series at Watkins Glen International after Stewart suffered a broken leg in a sprint car accident. He posted a solid top 15 finish. Papis also competed in the inaugural Nationwide Children's Hospital 200 at the Mid-Ohio Sports Car Course for Richard Childress Racing, finishing in fourth place.

Papis drove for NTS Motorsports in the Camping World Truck Series' inaugural race at Canadian Tire Motorsport Park, the 2013 Chevrolet Silverado 250, in September 2013. Finishing 6th in the event, he was slapped following the race by the girlfriend of driver Mike Skeen, who he had crashed with on the final lap, suffering a dislocated jaw.

Also in 2013, Papis ran 4 races in the NASCAR Whelen Euro Series Elite 1 Division, he ran two races driving No. 33 Chevrolet for OverDrive team and two races driving No. 19 Chevrolet for his own team (Max Papis Racing). Papis had a best finish of 2nd at Tours Speedway.
 
In 2014, Papis' team fielded the No. 99 car for the NASCAR Whelen Euro Series for Kevin Gilardoni in the Elite 1 Division.

In 2017, Papis ran one race in NASCAR K&N Pro Series East driving No. 13 Toyota for Eric McClure at Watkins Glen International, he started 17th and finished 18th after the engine blew.

Other racing
In 2016, Papis made his debut in Stadium Super Trucks series, running the Honda Indy Toronto rounds in the No. 9 truck. He finished eleventh and seventh.

"Mad Max"

Papis earned the nickname "Mad Max" at the 1996 24 Hours of Daytona during his last stint at the end of the race. Although his second-place Ferrari 333SP had been battered due to collisions, some of its bodywork held together by tape, Papis unlapped himself by passing the race leader (the Doyle Racing Riley & Scott-Oldsmobile driven by Wayne Taylor) and proceeded to set some of the fastest laps of the entire race. Taylor was nursing his car around the track due to an overheating problem and otherwise would have been able to cruise to a win, but Papis' pace and the slowing Oldsmobile suggested that Papis could theoretically take the win from him. Papis' speed was achieved at the cost of maximum fuel consumption. At one point late in the race, Papis came into the pits for fuel, spectacularly racing down the pit lane at near full speed. (Pit lane speed limits were imposed the next year). Taylor was still ahead by 64 seconds at the end of the race.

Motorsports career results

Complete International Formula 3000 results
(key) (Races in bold indicate pole position) (Races in italics indicate fastest lap)

Complete Formula One results
(key)

Complete American open wheel results
(key)

CART

IndyCar Series

 1 Run on same day.
 2 Non-points-paying, exhibition race.

Indy 500 results

24 Hours of Le Mans results

ASCAR results

NASCAR
(key) (Bold – Pole position awarded by qualifying time. Italics – Pole position earned by points standings or practice time. * – Most laps led.)

Sprint Cup Series

Daytona 500

Xfinity Series

Camping World Truck Series

Whelen Euro Series – Elite 1

International Race of Champions
(key) (Bold - Pole position. * – Most laps led.)

IMSA SportsCar Championship results
(key)(Races in bold indicate pole position, Results are overall/class)

References

External links

 
 

Living people
1969 births
Sportspeople from Como
Italian racing drivers
Italian Formula One drivers
Indianapolis 500 drivers
24 Hours of Le Mans drivers
24 Hours of Daytona drivers
NASCAR drivers
International Race of Champions drivers
IndyCar Series drivers
Champ Car drivers
Italian Formula Three Championship drivers
International Formula 3000 drivers
A1 Team Italy drivers
American Le Mans Series drivers
Rolex Sports Car Series drivers
Arrows Formula One drivers
Supercars Championship drivers
WeatherTech SportsCar Championship drivers
ASCAR drivers
Stadium Super Trucks drivers
Team Penske drivers
Rahal Letterman Lanigan Racing drivers
Stewart-Haas Racing drivers
KV Racing Technology drivers
Cheever Racing drivers
Corvette Racing drivers
Action Express Racing drivers
Richard Childress Racing drivers
Chip Ganassi Racing drivers
Nürburgring 24 Hours drivers